Baruar may refer to:

 Baruar, Hardoi district, Uttar Pradesh state
 Baruar, Kaimur district, Bihar state
 Baruar, Madhubani district, Bihar state